Kenneth Wayne Jones (November 9, 1950 – January 13, 2021) was an American LGBT rights activist.

Life and career 
Jones was born in Paterson, New Jersey, to parents Viola and Hannibal Jones. He had a sister. After moving to San Francisco in 1969, Jones joined the Navy and served three tours in Vietnam War. In 1972, he was assigned to Treasure Island, San Francisco, before being honorably discharged. He had said, "In those days you’d get a dishonorable discharge if they discovered you were gay. I was a Vietnam vet with medals. A dishonorable discharge was not in my cards."

After the service, Jones moved to the Castro District, San Francisco in 1973, where he began working for the San Francisco Pride committee, eventually becoming its leader. He was a volunteer at the Kaposi's Sarcoma Research and Education Foundation, which later became the San Francisco AIDS Foundation. He left the SF Pride organization in 1991, following the beating of Rodney King, to focus on police reform issues.

After being diagnosed with HIV, Jones moved to Ocean Beach, San Francisco, where he "spent a decade preparing to die with dignity" only to realize that "[he] might not be dying after all". He withdrew from public activism for a number of years, before his health improved in the 2000s. In 2009, he became a member of the citizen review board for the Bay Area Rapid Transit Police Department.

In 2017, he served as a consultant on the miniseries When We Rise. He was portrayed in the show by actors Jonathan Majors and Michael Kenneth Williams.

Jones was also an ordained deacon.

Death 
In September 2020, Jones was diagnosed with bladder cancer. On January 13, 2021, he died from the disease at the San Francisco VA Medical Center, aged 70.

References 

1950 births
2021 deaths
Deaths from bladder cancer
Deaths from cancer in California
Gay military personnel
HIV/AIDS activists
LGBT people from New Jersey
American LGBT rights activists
People with HIV/AIDS
United States Navy personnel of the Vietnam War